Victoria Grove is a street in Kensington, London W8. House building began in 1837 and was completed in 1841.

The land locally was bought by John Inderwick (1785–1867) in 1836, "variously described as optician or ivory turner, and latterly as an importer of meerschaum pipes and snuff boxes", who became a successful speculative developer, and the architect was probably Joel Bray.

It runs from Launceston Place in the north west to Gloucester Road in the south east. 6-13, 18, 19-26, and 27-28 are all Grade II listed houses.

The street is mentioned in Old Possum's Book of Practical Cats by T. S. Eliot as the home of Mungojerrie and Rumpleteazer.

References

External links

1830s establishments in England
Streets in the Royal Borough of Kensington and Chelsea
Kensington